Thompson Coburn LLP is a U.S. law firm with offices in Chicago, Dallas, Los Angeles, New York, Southern Illinois, St. Louis and Washington, D.C. The firm has been especially active in the field of product liability.

History
The firm was founded in 1929 and became known as Thompson Coburn in 1996 through the merger of two St. Louis firms, Thompson & Mitchell and Coburn & Croft. In July 2007 Thompson Coburn merged with Fagel Haber of Chicago. In 2013, the firm merged with Los Angeles-based Freedman Weisz LLP and opened an office in Los Angeles.

In 2000, Thompson Coburn attorney Michael Lazaroff admitted that he had charged clients for "$380,651 worth of entertainment and gifts they believed were free", using falsified bills that inflated costs for telephone and fax charges, witness preparation and courier and legal services. The Associated Press reported that Lazaroff left Thompson Coburn and would surrender his law license. Thompson Coburn's chairman John Musgrave said that according to an independent audit, Lazaroff had improperly billed around 50 clients, and no other lawyer besides Lazaroff was involved in the billing irregularities.

In 2008, Union Planters Bank, then operating as Magna, filed a complaint against Thompson Coburn alleging negligence and breach of contract and seeking $11,789,053 from the firm, in an amendment to an earlier suit filed in 2003. Magna was eventually awarded $3,654,606.40 in damages by a Madison County Circuit Court jury. Both parties appealed, but the judgment was upheld by Fifth District Appellate Court justices in 2010.

In July 2020, Roman Wuller succeeded Tom Minogue as chairman. In July 2021, Thompson Coburn combined with Hahn & Hessen and opened a new office in New York.

Notable cases
 Thompson Coburn served as co-counsel in Hosanna-Tabor Evangelical Lutheran Church and School v. Equal Employment Opportunity Commission, a First Amendment case that the New York Times called the “most significant religious liberty decision in two decades.” The unanimous Supreme Court ruling supported Hosanna-Tabor.

Community involvement
 Thompson Coburn was the first major law firm in Missouri to support a bill extending basic workplace protections to members of the LGBT community.
 Thompson Coburn represented the Boys & Girls Clubs of Greater St. Louis pro bono in a $30 million EPA settlement to clean up 10-acre Superfund site in St. Louis.
 Thompson Coburn is a sponsor of Street law, a pipeline program with the Association of Corporate Counsel that introduces high school students to possible careers in the law.

Notable lawyers

Kit Bond, former Missouri governor and U.S. Senator (joined immediately after leaving the Senate in 2010)
Robin Carnahan, Secretary of State of Missouri, worked for predecessor firm Thompson & Mitchell prior to her political career.
John Cullerton, member and President of the Illinois Senate (D-6th dist.)  is a partner in the firm.
Thomas Eagleton, former U.S. Senator for Missouri and one-time vice-presidential candidate, became a partner in the firm after the end of his Senate career.
Thomas Schlafly, partner, is also co-founder of the St. Louis Brewery.
Louis B. Susman, United States Ambassador to the United Kingdom, was a partner at the firm.

References

External links

Law firms established in 1996